Diacidia is a genus in the Malpighiaceae, a family of about 75 genera of flowering plants in the order Malpighiales. Diacidia comprises 11 species of trees, shrubs, and subshrubs. Ten species (subg. Sipapoa) are found on the mountains of southern Venezuela and adjacent Brazil; one species (D. galphimioides) is widespread in the drainages of the Rio Negro and the Río Vaupés in Venezuela, Colombia, and Brazil.

Species

External links
Malpighiaceae Malpighiaceae - description, taxonomy, phylogeny, and nomenclature
Diacidia

Malpighiaceae
Malpighiaceae genera